The 2022 Italian football summer transfer window runs from 1 July to 1 September 2022. This list includes transfers featuring at least one club from either Serie A or Serie B.

Transfers
Legend
Those clubs in Italic indicate that the player already left the team on loan on this or the previous season or a new signing that immediately left the club.

Footnotes

References

2022–23 in Italian football
Italy
2022